Seven Simeons: A Russian Tale is a 1937 picture book by Boris Artzybasheff. The story is a Russian fairy tale of seven brothers who work together to find a wife for the King. The book was a recipient of a 1938 Caldecott Honor for its illustrations.

References

1937 children's books
American picture books
Caldecott Honor-winning works